The 1983 Imo State gubernatorial election occurred in Nigeria on August 13, 1983. The NPP nominee Sam Mbakwe won the election, defeating other candidates.

Sam Mbakwe emerged NPP candidate.

Electoral system 
The Governor of Imo State is elected using the plurality voting system.

Primary election

NPP primary 
The NPP primary election was won by Sam Mbakwe.

Results

References 

Imo State gubernatorial elections
Imo State gubernatorial election
Imo State gubernatorial election
Imo State gubernatorial election